Janny Grip Isachsen (27  January 1835 - 1 July 1894)  was a Norwegian stage actress.  

Janny Grip Isachsen was engaged at the Det norske Theater (Bergen) in 1852-58, Christiania Norwegian Theatre 1860-62, Throndhjems Theater 1862-65, Christiania Theatre 1865-70 and Christiania Folketheater in 1872. 

In 1853, she was married to actor and playwright  Andreas Hornbeck Isachsen (1829-1903).

References

Other sources
 Jensson, Liv (1981) Biografisk skuespillerleksikon. Norske, danske og svenske skuespillere på norske scener særlig på 1800-talle (Oslo: Universitetsforlaget) .

1835 births
1894 deaths
Actors from Bergen
19th-century Norwegian actresses
Norwegian stage actresses